Stephen James "Steve" Moneghetti,  (born 26 September 1962), is an Australian long-distance runner and physical health consultant, represented Australia on many occasions. Moneghetti has a degree in civil engineering, a graduate diploma in education and an honorary doctorate from the University of Ballarat. He is a personal development consultant with the Ministry of Education and chair of the Victorian Review into Physical and Sport Education in Schools.

Moneghetti was born in Ballarat, Victoria, and was not considered to be a good runner in primary school. When he attempted to join Little Athletics, his father was told that Moneghetti was not wanted. However, by high school (St Patrick's College, Ballarat) he had developed into an excellent endurance athlete and was well on his way to becoming one of Australia's greatest marathon runners.

He is married to Tanya Moneghetti and they have four children Emma, Laura, Matthew and Olivia.

He started out as a 10,000 metre runner and finished fifth in that event at the 1986 Commonwealth Games. He ran his first marathon at the same meet winning the bronze medal. His first marathon victory was in Berlin in 1990 in the time of 2:08:16, coming only a couple of weeks after winning the Great North Run in 1:00:34.  In 1991 he set the course record of 40:03 for Sydney's iconic 14 km City 2 Surf, which still stands. In 1994 he won the Tokyo Marathon and the marathon at the Commonwealth Games. He came 3rd in the 1997 World Championships marathon race. He has also competed in the marathon at four Olympic Games; 1988 in Seoul, 1992 in Barcelona, 
1996 in Atlanta and 2000 in Sydney. His best performance in the Olympics was 5th place at Seoul in 1988.

Moneghetti's last race representing Australia was the Sydney 2000 Olympic Marathon. After meeting trouble in the middle of the race he recovered to finish 10th. In the interview after the race, he thanked Australia for its support during his long career.

Moneghetti continued to race for fun in other events in Australia such as the City to Surf and Sydney and Melbourne Marathons on an infrequent basis. He is the only male to have won the Sydney City to Surf four times in succession (1988–
1991). On 25 July 2010, Moneghetti won the Park2Park 10 km race at Ipswich in Queensland, finishing with a race record time of 32:18. In 2014, he competed in the Oceania Masters Athletics Cross Country Championships hosted in Bendigo. Moneghetti won the event, against strong competition from the likes of future U50 masters world champion Michael Wray.

He lit the cauldron in his hometown of Ballarat to celebrate the Sydney 2000 Olympic Games. He was the Mayor of the Commonwealth Games Village at the Melbourne Commonwealth Games in 2006.

In 2010 he was named as the Australian team's chef de mission for the 2010 Commonwealth Games in Delhi, India.

In 2014 he was nominated for an Order of Australia medal and was quoted to say 'Not bad for not winning an Olympic gold at Athens athletics'.

On 24. September 2017 he finished the 44th Berlin Marathon in the time of 3:27:30.

In 2021, he was inducted into Sport Australia Hall of Fame as a general member.

Moneghetti's heritage can be traced to the Swiss Italians of Australia.

Media
Moneghetti appears in a feature film titled Reverse Runner. He plays the fictional character of John Johns, a retired champion at the 100 meter backwards sprint. The film is a sporting comedy which also features a cameo from Bruce McAvaney.

References
Statistics

1962 births
Living people
Olympic athletes of Australia
Australian male long-distance runners
Australian male marathon runners
Athletes (track and field) at the 1986 Commonwealth Games
Athletes (track and field) at the 1990 Commonwealth Games
Athletes (track and field) at the 1994 Commonwealth Games
Athletes (track and field) at the 1998 Commonwealth Games
Athletes (track and field) at the 1988 Summer Olympics
Athletes (track and field) at the 1992 Summer Olympics
Athletes (track and field) at the 1996 Summer Olympics
Athletes (track and field) at the 2000 Summer Olympics
Sportspeople from Ballarat
Australian people of Swiss-Italian descent
Federation University Australia alumni
World Athletics Championships medalists
Members of the Order of Australia
Commonwealth Games gold medallists for Australia
Commonwealth Games silver medallists for Australia
Commonwealth Games bronze medallists for Australia
Berlin Marathon male winners
Commonwealth Games medallists in athletics
People educated at St Patrick's College, Ballarat
Sport Australia Hall of Fame inductees
Medallists at the 1986 Commonwealth Games
Medallists at the 1990 Commonwealth Games
Medallists at the 1994 Commonwealth Games
Medallists at the 1998 Commonwealth Games